Indonesia participated in the 1978 Asian Games held in Bangkok, Thailand from December 9, 1978 to December 20, 1978. This country was ranked ninth with 8 gold medals, 7 silver medals and 18 bronze medals with a total of 33 medals.

Medal summary

Medal table

Medalists

References

Nations at the 1978 Asian Games
1978